John DeWolf (1817–1895) was a member of the Wisconsin State Assembly. 

John DeWolf or de Wolf may also refer to:

John DeWolf (judge) (1760–1841), justice of the Rhode Island Supreme Court
John de Wolf (born 1962), Dutch footballer
John de Wolf (politician) (c. 1931–2003), Canadian politician